Iliamna can refer to:

Places in the United States
 Iliamna, Alaska, a census-designated place
 Iliamna Bay on the Kenai Peninsula, Alaska
 Iliamna Lake in Alaska
 Iliamna River in Alaska
 Iliamna Volcano in Alaska

Other uses
 Iliamna (plant), a genus of mallow

See also
 Lilamna, an extinct genus of sharks